The LG-KU990 or LG-KE990 (known and marketed as the LG Viewty) is a high-end mobile phone manufactured by LG Electronics, released in August 2007. It has a resistive touchscreen and was specially marketed for its camera, being the first touchscreen phone with a powerful camera. It was succeeded by the LG Renoir and later LG Viewty Smart.

Features

Camera

The phone's main selling point was its 5-megapixel digital camera with Schneider Kreuznach optics, Xenon flash, autofocus, and a digital image stabilizer. It featured an ISO 800-equivalent High-Sensitivity mode for night scenery shots and "Smart Light" for bright and clear images in the dark. It allowed capturing DivX VGA video at 30fps, and QVGA at 120fps for slow-motion playback. According to the manufacturer, the camera's frame rate was high enough to film a balloon bursting.

Applications
The device supported Flash Lite 2 and MIDP Java 2.0. There were a few built-in system applications like Office and a PDF document viewer, movie and photo editor, and Obigo web browser.

Later Releases
An updated model, the KU990i, was later released, but only in European markets. It features a new camera module, the strobe flash is replaced by a LED, it has no image stabilization nor Schneider Kreuznach optics, although it features always-on flash mode and automatic smile and face detection. Physically, the inner camera lens seemed to be slightly smaller.

Limitations
The organizer in the phone could only store 100 calendar events and isn't officially listed on the compatible list with the popular GooSync, which helps sync phone calendars with Google Calendar (though it does work by using instructions for LG Arena). Also some public customer reviews of the LG Viewty stated concerns over poor battery life, mainly due to the large touchscreen. Also released was a variant without 3g called the KE990.

Sales
LG reported sales of 310,000 units in Europe in the first five weeks. A blog entry by UK mobile phone reseller Dial-A-Phone suggested that the Viewty may be outselling the Apple iPhone in the region, citing anecdotal reports of sluggish sales and Apple's reluctance to publish figures for the iPhone in the region as evidence. The pricing and featuresets of the two phones were used as an explanation. This story was picked up and widely reported by technology news sites and blogs, however without official sales figures for the iPhone, it could not be confirmed or refuted at the time.

The phone was never released in the United States.

Specification sheet

See also 
Information appliance
LG Prada
LG Secret
Samsung Ultra Smart F700
Nokia N95
Nokia N82
Sony Ericsson K850i
iPhone
HTC Touch
Sony Ericsson W960

References

External links 
Official Website 
TechCast Reviews the LG Viewty KU990 - with video

KU990
Mobile phones introduced in 2007